The following is an episode list for the Lifetime series Drop Dead Diva, a comedic drama series telling the story of a shallow model-in-training who dies in a sudden accident only to find her soul resurfacing in the body of a brilliant, thoughtful and plus-size attorney.

A total of 78 episodes of Drop Dead Diva were produced over six seasons, between July 12, 2009, and June 22, 2014.

Series overview

Episodes

Season 1 (2009)

Season 2 (2010)

Season 3 (2011)

Season 4 (2012)

Season 5 (2013)

Season 6 (2014)

Ratings

References

External links
 Drop Dead Diva on Lifetime
 

Lists of American comedy-drama television series episodes
Lists of American fantasy television series episodes